8D Entertainment (Korean: 에잇디크리에이티브) is a privately held multinational entertainment and service group based in Seoul. The company was founded on 23 March 2017 by Kim Shin-ae as a food and beverage service company, and later diversified into the entertainment industry. It currently manages artists such as OnlyOneOf and former Iz*One member Kang Hye-won.

History
The company was formed by Kim Shin-ae on March 23, 2017, as a food and beverage service company, operating the "8D Seoul Cafe" in Dosan Park Gangnam. Prior to founding 8D Creative, Kim had experience in founding the bakery goodovening (굿오브닝; later sold to a Japanese company) and the pizza chain Mick Jones's Pizza (믹존스 피자). The name "8D" is based on the :D (happy face) emoticon, which symbolizes both her experiences as a businesswoman and divorced single mom, as well as her mission to create a "funky" workplace.

8D Creative was later sold to ESV (now Kyungnam Pharm Healthcare), with Kim Shin-ae staying as president and CEO. The acquisition propelled the company's diversification to other industries including music and entertainment.

In the first half of 2018, 8D Creative trainee Kang Hye-won was sent to participate in the survival girl group television show Produce 48. She finished eighth and debuted as part of Iz*One.

On June 15, 2018, actor Kam Woo-sung signed the exclusive contract with 8D. On October 10, actress Yoo In-young also joined the company.

On April 30, 2019, 8D Creative established two new subsidiaries, an actor-specialized management WIP and an idol-specialized label RSVP.

On November 12, 2020, RSVP was renamed as 8D Entertainment and 8D Creative was integrated into the company. Kim Shin-ae became the executive director of the company, with Park Jin-hyoung replacing her as president and CEO.

Subsidiaries
WIP - talent management agency
 Féerien - beauty products company
Thief & Heist - jewelry store (with Thief & Heist LLC)
IVSI - eyewear company
8D F&B - foodservice company
8D City Cafe
THA TABLE (Thai cuisine)
SUSU-SHISHI (Japanese cuisine)
Taupe (European casual dining)

Rosters

Independent labels

8D Entertainment
 Kang Hye-won
 OnlyOneOf
 Choi HEART

WIP
 Gam Woo-sung
 Jeon Sa-ra
 Kim Ha-kyeong
 Kim I-ni
 Kim Min-joung
 Ko Tae-kyung
 Park Shin-ah
 Park You-na
 Yang Mi-kyung

Former artists
 Choi Yoo-ha (2018-2019)
 Jeong Kang-hee (2018-2019)
 Kim Ki-beom (2018-2019)
 Lee So-ra (2018-2019)
 Tashiro Erina (2018-2019)
 Park Ji-yeon (2018-2020)
 Shin Ye-ji (2018-2020)
 Kang Ye-seul (2018-2021)
 Ko Sung-min (2018-2021)
 Yoo In-young (2018-2021)

Discography

References

Companies based in Seoul
K-pop record labels
South Korean record labels
Talent agencies of South Korea
Entertainment companies established in 2018
Record labels established in 2018